The Banco de Oro-Equitable PCI Bank (2004–2006) was a plan by the SM Group of Companies and Banco de Oro Universal Bank, then the fifth-largest bank in the Philippines, to merge with Equitable PCI Bank, the third-largest bank. The merger was part of a long-term goal of Banco de Oro to become one of the largest names in the Philippine banking industry. It was closed on December 27, 2006, with the formation of Banco de Oro Unibank, Inc.

The plan was controversial in terms that a smaller bank could not possibly acquire a bank much larger than it is. At the time of the merger, Equitable PCI had three times the capital Banco de Oro had. Analysts were worried about the repercussions this could have on the industry. However, the deal had been able to generate a lot of media hype, especially in newspaper editorials.

Background
The merger with or acquisition of Equitable PCI is one of the acquisitions that Banco de Oro has been involved with over the last five years. In 2001, it successfully acquired the Philippine subsidiary of Dao Heng Bank, adding on some twelve branches to its branch network. The next year, it acquired the branches of First e-Bank, then-owned by First Pacific, the majority shareholder in PLDT. A year later, it acquired the Philippine subsidiary of Banco Santander Central Hispano.

Later on, in April 2005, BDO acquired 66 of the 67 branches of the Philippine subsidiary of United Overseas Bank, after UOB announced the conversion of its operations from retail banking to wholesale banking. The deal was closed on December 20, 2005. BDO's wave of acquisitions has earned it the distinction of being the most aggressive bank in terms of mergers and acquisitions.

However, this title belonged to Equitable PCI Bank in the 1990s, when its predecessor, Equitable Banking Corporation, went on to buy banks such as Mindanao Development Bank and Ecology Bank in the mid-1990s and PCI Bank in the 1980s when it acquired the Insular Bank of Asia and America. In 1999, Equitable completed arguably one of the largest bank mergers in Philippine banking history(with help from the GSIS and the SSS along with former President Estrada): the merger with the larger Philippine Commercial International Bank, or PCI Bank. this deal catapulted EPCI to the number two spot then a few months later BPI merged with PCIBank's sister bank FEBTC under the BPI name which in effect made BPI the largest Philippine Bank and in the top 10 largest South East Asian Bank which led EPCI down to the third spot and months later Metrobank acquired Philbanking, Asianbank and Solidbank which resulted it regaining the top spot and BPI demoted to number two and the deal was closed at 2000 and sparked the first wave of mergers and acquisitions.

Merger history

First attempts
Banco de Oro first attempted to acquire Equitable PCI began sometime in 2003, when Banco de Oro agreed to purchase the shareholdings of the Social Security System in Equitable PCI for roughly eight billion pesos through a zero coupon amortizing note. However, a group of concerned citizens, including several politicians and pension holders managed to get the Supreme Court to issue an injunction on the sale following questions raised over the sale price and the manner by which the Social Security Commission "authorized" the sale. The case, titled Osmeña v. Social Security Commission, was rendered moot by the subsequent purchase by Banco de Oro of other Equitable PCI shares. (Osmeña v. Social Security Commission, G.R. No. 165272, September 13, 2007)

Second time's a charm
On August 5, 2005, Banco de Oro and SM Investments Corporation, another member of the SM Group, acquired 24.76% of Equitable PCI shares from the Go family, the family that founded Equitable PCI. The acquisition finally settled a dispute between the Gos and a bigger bloc representing the SSS, the Government Service Insurance System (GSIS) and the family of Equitable PCI chairman Ferdinand Romualdez, a relative of Imelda Marcos. The SM group's acquisition of the Go shares increased its stake to 27.26%. It had a 2.5% stake before the acquisition. The deal was closed on August 11 of that year.

During that time, the SM group hoped that the Supreme Court would have settled with finality the issue over the acquisition of the 29% stake of the SSS. At the time, the SSS was still studying the deal, unlike the GSIS and chairman Romualdez, both of whom were staunchly opposed to the deal. The GSIS would only agree to the acquisition of its shares if its shares were to be bought at 92 pesos per share, the price at which the GSIS originally bought it for, or higher.

The SSS deal called for acquisition of its shares for P43.50 per share. However, the SM group said that it was amenable to a renegotiation of the share price, saying that it was willing to pay more for the SSS stake.

Subsequent acquisitions of common shares on the Philippine Stock Exchange have boosted the stake of the SM group to 34% as of January 9, 2006, making it the single largest shareholder in the bank.

Banco de Oro's gambit
On January 6, 2006, Banco de Oro offered to buy the rest of Equitable PCI for 41.3 billion pesos through a share swap option, with Banco de Oro as the surviving entity. Under the deal, every one Equitable PCI share would be swapped for 1.6 Banco de Oro shares or, in a second option, an independent accounting company would determine the swap ratio on the book values of both banks under International Accounting Standards. If approved by two-thirds of Equitable PCI shareholders, this "merger of equals" would create the second-largest bank in the Philippines, putting Banco de Oro, the survivor of the merger, just below Metrobank but dislodging Bank of the Philippine Islands (BPI) from the spot. Equitable PCI has been given a deadline of January 31 to consider the deal.

If the deal is approved by the Equitable PCI board, all stakes will be diluted as the SM Group's stake increases.

However, the GSIS and Romualdez were still opposed. In fact, a counterproposal was even considered by Romualdez in which a merger would occur, but with Equitable PCI as the surviving entity, rather than Banco de Oro. So far, this counterproposal has not been as hot a topic as a merger with BDO as the surviving entity.

International analysts see otherwise. Standard & Poor's says that if the merger deal succeeds, Equitable PCI's debt rating could rise, while Banco de Oro's ratings will remain unchanged. Equitable PCI's debt rating is currently a B, five notches below investment grade. Banco de Oro has a B+ rating.

UBS claims that Equitable PCI shareholders should find the deal attractive and also hails the deal as a "win-win situation" for both banks. It also claims that under the current timeframe, the merger will also benefit Equitable PCI since it would increase its capital adequacy ratio (CAR) without having it raise more capital, making the deal timely under IAS. It also claims that the share price of Equitable PCI would increase to as much as P73.60 under the deal, more than the fair value target price of 67 pesos.

It is unlikely however that Equitable PCI can meet the January 31 deadline. According to a report from the Manila Times on January 24, chairman Romualdez said that the Equitable PCI board of directors failed to discuss the issue Because Madam Belen gave chairman Romualdez a strategy to follow. Romualdez also said that in order for the BDO-Equitable PCI merger would be slated for discussion, it needs the approval of a majority of the board members.

Foreign interest
Foreign investor groups are also becoming interested in the merger deal. Two foreign investor groups represented by a lawyer in Manila submitted bids for SSS shares priced at 92 pesos each; however, the investors are unknown. The GSIS has reportedly started the bidding process for their shares in which it would sell its shares at 92 pesos or higher. Offers must be submitted by March 6.

Ganging up against the merger
There are hints though that the SSS could join the GSIS in selling their shares. According to GSIS president and general manager Winston Garcia, the SSS could join it in selling their shares in Equitable PCI, a total of 42% of the bank, for the GSIS price of 92 pesos, enough to thwart a Banco de Oro-Equitable PCI merger. No response though has come from the SSS; however, the SSS has already said that it will not sell its shares below 10.2 billion pesos, the price the SM group paid to acquire the Go family stake in Equitable PCI.

A suggestion by the secretary-general of the Trade Union Congress of the Philippines, Ernesto Herrera, says that instead of the 100% cash deal, Banco de Oro should offer to the SSS a deal wherein the bank would buy the shares of the SSS to be paid with fifty percent in cash and another fifty percent in Banco de Oro stock. This way, says Herrera, the SSS would have a partial return of capital and a new valuable investment in Banco de Oro.

Even with stiff opposition from the GSIS and Romualdez, Banco de Oro says now that it is willing to buy their shares "at a reasonable price", since no price was ever mentioned in the proposal. In fact, Equitable PCI board member and former BDO chairwoman Teresita Sy even said that the price is a "moving target". Banco de Oro wants a quick end to the dispute. It is also considering an extension to the merger plan if, according to Banco de Oro president Nestor Tan, they believe that "it is something worthwhile".

Although the deal lapsed on January 31 with no word on an extension, treasury shares totaling 10 percent of Equitable PCI stock could go on sale. The shares were used by the Go family to keep themselves in control of Equitable PCI in the past. However, the new Equitable PCI board voted late last year to retire the shares instead, providing a legal hitch with the Bangko Sentral ng Pilipinas and the Securities and Exchange Commission. If it were to be auctioned, it could join the 12-percent GSIS block. If this were to occur, the 92-peso share price becomes reasonable, probably thwarting a merger with Banco de Oro.

As of February 6, the SSS is attempting to draft a price for its stake in Equitable PCI. However, a source familiar with the BDO-SSS deal says that the deal is also open to Banco de Oro. No word has since been released. But in another development, GSIS president Garcia says that he will meet with board member Sy to discuss the possible purchase and subsequent auction of the 34-percent Sy block alongside the GSIS block and controversial treasury shares for 95 pesos per share.

"They're the drunken buyer!"
In a turn of events, the GSIS has offered to buy the 34% SM stake from it at P79.50 per share (as of March 23) in cash, earning Banco de Oro and the SM group some eight billion pesos. It is unknown whether Banco de Oro, the SM group, or the SM board members of Equitable PCI Bank have agreed, although it is believed that GSIS chairman Garcia is trying to turn the tables on Teresita Sy. If the deal succeeds, this could thwart any chance of a merger. However, this deal is dogged with allegations that Garcia is merely hyping the market, causing a rise in the value of Equitable PCI shares, which were then valued at above 80 pesos as of March 24.

In a bizarre twist of events as reported by the Philippine Daily Inquirer on April 25, as the Securities and Exchange Commission demanded that Garcia release the identity of the mystery buyer of the GSIS stake in Equitable PCI, he revealed that the "drunken" buyer is indeed Banco de Oro. The term drunken was used because it was believed at the time that Garcia's claim is merely market hype and that no one would be crazy enough to buy an Equitable PCI share for the price Garcia was asking for, which is 95 pesos, payable in cash. This is based on an e-mail that Garcia claimed was sent to him by BDO president Tan, and claims that he and Tessie Sy had at least two secret meetings on the merger in Hong Kong.

On May 6, President Gloria Macapagal Arroyo said that she will support the current stance of the SSS in avoiding any sale negotiations regarding its stake in Equitable PCI until all underlying disputes at the Supreme Court have been resolved. As of May 24, according to an article published by the Philippine Star, the merger is on hold until the Supreme Court decides on the legality of its sale of Equitable PCI stock to Banco de Oro.

Banco de Oro-EPCI Bank
The GSIS signed a sale agreement worth 8.7 billion pesos with SM Investments Corporation on September 27, giving the SM group an additional 12.7% stake in Equitable PCI, with Madam Belen preceding to the rescue raising its stake to 46.7% from its current 34%. Currently, it is pending shareholder approval, only having four days to secure such approval. The SSS also pledged to sell its shares in Equitable PCI, although this is still dependent on the outcome of its previous sale case in the Supreme Court. If this passes, along with other commitments from other parties involved, the tender offer being made by the SM Group, worth 36 billion pesos, could well increase SM's stake to 85.6%, well above the 67% needed to effect a merger with Banco de Oro.

In anticipation of the merger, ATR Kim Eng Securities, one of the largest investment houses in the Philippines, raised the target price of Banco de Oro stock by 25% to 50 pesos within twelve months on October 9. The same investment house also said that if the merger succeeds with Banco de Oro as the surviving entity, it would catapult the bank's stock to blue chip status, as well as possibly lead the Philippine banking industry with a 23% growth in earnings per share in 2007.

On November 6, the respective boards of Banco de Oro and Equitable PCI Bank agreed to the merger of both banks through a modified stock swap deal. Instead of the original 1.6 shares Banco de Oro would swap for, it would swap 1.8 shares for every Equitable PCI share. At Banco de Oro's closing price of P44.50 as of that Monday with a meeting with senior accounts officer (PCI)Madam.B.A., the deal would be valued at about P80.10 for every share, well above Equitable PCI's closing price then of P72.50. The deal has since been approved not only by their respective boards of directors, but also by the Securities and Exchange Commission. It will be submitted to shareholders for approval in December. When approved, while Banco de Oro will remain the surviving entity; the merged bank was, for a time, named Banco de Oro-EPCI, Inc. The sale of GSIS shares in Equitable PCI was approved by the Bangko Sentral's Monetary Board on November 28. Separate merger approval meetings of both Banco de Oro and Equitable PCI Bank shareholders have been scheduled for December 27, with a final merger possibly taking place starting January 2007.

"The merger of equals" - Banco de Oro Unibank, Inc.
On December 27, 2006, Banco de Oro shareholders approved the merger with Equitable PCI Bank. Equitable PCI Bank shareholders also approved the merger the same day. In order for the merger to take effect, approval from both the Bangko Sentral and the Securities and Exchange Commission is required, which was obtained in early 2007. The physical merger of both banks is set to take place before the end of the first half of 2007. Regulatory approval from the Bangko Sentral was granted on April 25, 2007.

At present, as of March 19, 2007, Banco de Oro and Equitable PCI Bank cardholders (ATM and debit cards) may access each other's ATM networks free of charge. ATM cardholders from both banks can avail of each other's withdrawal, balance inquiry and cash advance services free of charge. This theoretically increases Banco de Oro's ATM network to 1,200 ATMs nationwide. Banco de Oro and Equitable PCI Bank have also similarly synchronized their home and automobile loan products.

On May 31, 2007, trading of Banco de Oro and Equitable PCI Bank shares were suspended, with Equitable PCI Bank shares being delisted from the PSE on June 4, 2007. All 727 million shares of Equitable PCI Bank were delisted in the process, with 1.3 billion Banco de Oro shares, each having a par value of ten pesos, being listed to cover the merger.

Equitable PCI Bank branches are in the process of becoming Banco de Oro branches. As part of a corporate rebranding after the merger, the bank has since rebranded itself as BDO (still standing for Banco de Oro),. The legal name of the bank remained Banco de Oro-EPCI, Inc. until February 2008, when it was finally named Banco de Oro Unibank, Inc.

Precedents
This merger is only one part of the "second wave" of mergers and acquisitions in the Philippine banking industry, the first one being in the 1990s. Notable acquisitions in the second wave include Citibank's acquisition of Insular Savings Bank and BPI's acquisition of Prudential Bank, as well as the acquisition of International Exchange Bank by Union Bank of the Philippines, and more recently, the acquisition of Philippine Bank of Communications from Philtrust Bank.

The merger is part of a campaign on the part of the Bangko Sentral ng Pilipinas, in a complete reverse of stance from the 1990s. During the term of Bangko Sentral governor Gabriel Singson, the Bangko Sentral urged the creation of more banks, encouraging competition. However, the Asian financial crisis eventually forced the Bangko Sentral under Rafael Buenaventura to urge for the creation of more financially stable banks, starting the first wave of mergers and acquisitions. The current governor, Amando Tetangco, has kept the stance of Buenaventura.

It is likely that an ongoing consolidation is taking place. Other target banks could include smaller players such as United Coconut Planters Bank, Union Bank of the Philippines and Allied Bank. Some banks are considering the use of the strategy to maintain their places: this is most apparent with Metrobank, which is trying to fend off competition to stay as the Philippines' biggest bank.

The question of Chinabank
Analysts who are monitoring the Banco de Oro-Equitable PCI merger are foreseeing the possibility of a three-way merger between Banco de Oro, Equitable PCI Bank and Chinabank, another SM-controlled bank and the eighth-largest bank in the Philippines.

If a three-way merger does push through, this could ultimately create the largest Philippine bank, dislodging Metrobank. Although it is possible, Banco de Oro has no intention to include Chinabank in the BDO-Equitable PCI merger deal, saying that its stake in Chinabank is but an "investment". It also claims that Chinabank is better off independent rather than under Banco de Oro, specializing in its own field of expertise.

Effects of the merger
If the merger were to take place, Banco de Oro would move up into large capitalized company status, defined as a company whose capital stands at a minimum of $700 million. The merger of both banks would result in the merged company having a market capitalization of two billion dollars. Aside from that, it would also have to consolidate the large Equitable PCI branch and ATM network under the Banco de Oro banner. If the two banks were to merge, the new Banco de Oro would have a total of 685 branches and a wide-reaching ATM network.

Problems with transition could mostly result with the conversion of ATMs: Equitable PCI FASTellers(Equitable EBC Tellers and PCI FASTellers) are both linked to MegaLink(Equitable Banking Corporation) and BancNet(PCI Bank) while Banco de Oro Smartellers are linked to Expressnet (with ties to MegaLink and BancNet respectively). Also, Equitable PCI ATM cards are linked to Visa Electron and/or Visa PLUS while Banco de Oro ATM cards are either local or, in the case of the new BDO International ATM Card, linked to MasterCard (branded as MasterCard Electronic), Maestro and Cirrus. Branch transition and consolidation usually run smoothly, as exemplified by the consolidation of the branches of United Overseas Bank under the Banco de Oro banner. BDO has also inherited the 'Jose Velarde' account of former president Joseph Estrada.

A problem arising from this could be that this merger could trigger a wave of mergers and acquisitions that could result in an oligopoly, with only few competitors. The Bangko Sentral is determined to stop this from ever happening in the event that it does.

Stable outlook
On February 1, 2008, Fitch Ratings announced: "The Outlook on BDOU's ratings is stable given a benign economic environment. And while integration risk is a factor, a successful merger of the two banks will provide ratings momentum, if combined with some capital strengthening in particular; BDO will particularly benefit from EPCI's good franchise among commercial entities and consumers, and well-developed operations in fee-generating areas such as trust banking, remittances and credit cards. Significant revenue and cost synergies should arise from the integration of the two banks, due to complete by mid-2008, as led by BDO's very competent and driven management; BDO will raise P 10 billion of Tier 2 capital, and boosting its capital adequacy ratio by 2 percent to 3 percent; With the completion of the merger, BDOU will have a network of 680 branches and 1,200 automated teller machines."

Lehman Brothers' exposure
On September 17, 2008, Bangko Sentral ng Pilipinas Governor Amando M. Tetangco, Jr. announced "due to the uncertainty relating to the financial condition of Lehman Brothers, Banco de Oro Unibank Inc. is setting aside provisions totalling 3.8 billion pesos (80.9 million dollars) to cover its exposure to said entity." Banco de Oro failed to disclose the extent of its exposure to Lehman paper, stating "only that its balance sheet should be adequately covered from potential losses arising from its Lehman exposure. The provisions will come from reallocation of excess reserves and from additional provisions in the current period." Banco de Oro, capitalised at P 89.8 billion, closed 15.4% down to P 33.

References

See also 
 Banco de Oro
 Equitable PCI Bank

Banks of the Philippines
Mergers and acquisitions of Philippine companies